In computational fluid dynamics, the volume of fluid (VOF) method is a free-surface modelling technique, i.e. a numerical technique for tracking and locating the free surface (or fluid–fluid interface). It belongs to the class of Eulerian methods which are characterized by a mesh that is either stationary or is moving in a certain prescribed manner to accommodate the evolving shape of the interface. As such, VOF is an advection scheme—a numerical recipe that allows the programmer to track the shape and position of the interface, but it is not a standalone flow solving algorithm. The Navier–Stokes equations describing the motion of the flow have to be solved separately. The same applies for all other advection algorithms.

History
The volume of fluid method is based on earlier Marker-and-cell (MAC) methods. First accounts of what is now known as VOF have been given by Noh & Woodward in 1976, where fraction function  (see below) appeared, although the first publication in a Journal was by Hirt and Nichols in 1981. Since VOF method surpassed MAC by lowering computer storage requirements, it quickly became popular. Early applications include  Torrey et al. from Los Alamos, who created VOF codes for NASA (1985,1987). First implementations of VOF suffered from imperfect interface description, which was later remedied by introducing a Piecewise-Linear Interface Calculation (PLIC) scheme. Using VOF with PLIC is a contemporary standard, used in number of computer codes, such as FLOW-3D, Gerris (software), ANSYS Fluent, OpenFOAM, Simcenter STAR-CCM+ and CONVERGE.

Overview
The method is based on the idea of a so-called fraction function . It is a scalar function, defined as the integral of a fluid's characteristic function in the control volume, namely the volume of a computational grid cell. The volume fraction of each fluid is tracked through every cell in the computational grid, while all fluids share a single set of momentum equations, i.e. one for each spatial direction. From a perspective of a local point that contains no volume,  is a discontinuous function insofar as its value jumps from 0 to 1 when the local point moves from the non-tracked to the tracked phase. The normal direction of the fluid interface is found where the value of  changes most rapidly. With this method, the free-surface is not defined sharply, instead it is distributed over the height of a cell. Thus, in order to attain accurate results, local grid refinements have to be done. The refinement criterion is simple, cells with  have to be refined. A method for this, known as the marker and micro-cell method, has been developed by Raad and his colleagues in 1997.

The evolution of the -th fluid in a system on  fluids is governed by the transport equation (actually the same equation that has to be fulfilled by the level-set method distance function ):

 

with the following constraint

 ,

i.e., the volume of the fluids is constant. For each cell, properties such as density  are calculated by a volume fraction average of all fluids in the cell

 

These properties are then used to solve a single momentum equation through the domain, and the attained velocity field is shared among the fluids.

The VOF method is computationally friendly, as it introduces only one additional equation and thus requires minimal storage. The method is also characterized by its capability of dealing with highly non-linear problems in which the free-surface experiences sharp topological changes. By using the VOF method, one also evades the use of complicated mesh deformation algorithms used by surface-tracking methods. The major difficulty associated with the method is the smearing of the free-surface. This problem originates from excessive diffusion of the transport equation.

Discretization

To avoid smearing of the free-surface, the transport equation has to be solved without excessive diffusion. Thus, the success of a VOF method depends heavily on the scheme used for the advection of the  field. Any chosen scheme needs to cope with the fact that  is discontinuous, unlike e.g. the distance function  used in the  Level-Set method. 

Whereas a first order upwind scheme smears the interface, a downwind scheme of the same order will cause a false distribution problem which will cause erratic behavior in case of the flow is not oriented along a grid line. Over the years, a multitude of different methods for treating the advection have been developed. In the original VOF-article by Hirt, a donor-acceptor scheme was employed. This scheme formed a basis for the compressive differencing schemes.

The different methods for treating VOF can be roughly divided into three categories, namely the donor-acceptor formulation, higher order differencing schemes and line techniques.

The Donor-Acceptor Schemes 

The donor-acceptor scheme is based on two fundamental criteria, namely the boundedness criterion and the availability criterion. The first one states that the value of  has to be bounded between zero and one. The latter criterion ensures that the amount of fluid convected over a face during a time step is less than or equal to the amount available in the donor cell, i.e., the cell from which the fluid is flowing to the acceptor cell. In his original work, Hirt treated this with a blended scheme consisting of controlled downwinding and upwind differencing.

Higher Order Differencing Schemes 

In the higher order differencing schemes, as the name suggests, the convective transport equation is discretized with higher order or blended differencing schemes. Such methods include the Compressive Interface Capturing Scheme for Arbitrary Meshes (CICSAM)  and High Resolution Interface Capturing (HRIC)   scheme, which are both based on the Normalized Variable Diagram (NVD) by Leonard.

Geometrical Reconstruction Techniques 

Line techniques circumvent the problems associated with the discretization of the transport equation by not tracking the interface in a cell explicitly. Instead, the fluid distribution in a cell an interface is obtained by using the volume fraction distribution of neighbouring cells. The Simple Line Interface Calculation (SLIC) by Noh and Woodward from 1976 uses a simple geometry to reconstruct the interface. In each cell the interface is approximated as a line parallel to one of the coordinate axes and assumes different fluid configurations for the horizontal and vertical movements respectively. A widely used technique today is the Piecewise Linear Interface Calculation by Youngs.

 

where  is a vector normal to the interface. Components of the normal are found e.g. by using the finite difference method or its combination with least squares optimization. The free term  is then found (analytically or by approximation) by enforcing mass conservation within computational cell.

Interface capture issues 
In two-phase flows in which the properties of the two phases are vastly different, errors in the computation of the surface tension force at the interface cause Front-Capturing methods such as Volume of Fluid (VOF) and Level-Set method (LS) to develop interfacial spurious currents. To better solve such flows, special treatment is required to reduce such spurious currents. A few studies have looked at improving interface tracking by combining Level-set method and Volume of fluid methods while a few others have looked at improving the numerical solving algorithm by adding smoothening loops or improving property averaging techniques.

See also
 Immersed boundary method
 Stochastic Eulerian Lagrangian method
 Level-set method
 Sloshing

References

Computational fluid dynamics
Numerical differential equations